The women's K-4 500 metres sprint canoeing competition at the 2014 Asian Games in Hanam was held from 29 September at the Misari Canoe/Kayak Center.

Schedule
All times are Korea Standard Time (UTC+09:00)

Results

References 

Official website

External links 
Asian Canoe Confederation

Canoeing at the 2014 Asian Games